Shameless, is a 2008 Czech comedy film directed by Jan Hřebejk. Following their collaborations on A Novel for Women and The Holiday Makers, Czech filmmaker Hřebejk and author Michal Viewegh reunited for Shameless, a comic romp based on Viewegh's bestselling Tales of Marriage and Sex. Overall, the film was a commercial success.

Plot
Oskar (Jiří Macháček), a popular TV weather forecaster, suddenly wakes up to an altered sense of identity: rather than belonging to easygoing wife Zuzana (a bewildered Simona Babčáková), he feels he ought to belong to the whole wide world – hence the national embarrassment. His first entanglement is with babysitter Kocicka (Eva Kerekéšová), a lean teenybopper who's more attached to her pet turtle than her older lover – at least until he accidentally smothers it in the dryer. Next in line is mature pop icon Nora (Emília Vášáryová), who's about to teach him a thing or two about freedom: the more people you let in, the more alone you end up feeling.

Cast
Jiří Macháček as Oskar
Emília Vášáryová as Nora
Simona Babčáková as Zuzana
Pavel Liška as Matěj
Nina Divíšková as Marta, Oskar's mother
Pavel Landovský as Bedřich, Oskar's father
Eva Kerekéšová as Kočička
Martina Krátká as Simona
Vojta Husa as Jakub
Viktorie Fedorová as Terezka
Roman Luknár as Nora's son
Andy Hajdu as Nora's son
Kryštof Mucha as Robert
Marie Látová as Marie
Miloš Pokorný as radio speaker
Roman Ondráček as radio speaker
Peter Kracík as TV7 chief
Hana Seidlová as waitress
Karla Mráčková as bell-frog
Petra Eliáš-Voláková as bell-frog
Adam Holý as photographer
Renata Vajdáková as Matěj's wife

Lukáš Příkazký as cop
Štefan Capko as cop
Tomáš Hanák as theatre actor
Jiří Fero Burda as theatre actor
Jiří Gajdošík as hotel director
Ester Janečková as herself
Halina Pawlovská as herself
Přemek Podlaha as herself
Milan Šteindler as herself

Petr Čtvrtníček as herself
Michal Viewegh as herself
Martin Reiner as herself
Hana Hegerová as herself
Karel Gott as herself
Petr Malásek as musician
Zdeněk Fišer as musician
Robert Balzar as musician
František Kop as musician

References

External links
 

2008 comedy films
2008 films
Films directed by Jan Hřebejk
Czech comedy films
2000s Czech films
2000s Czech-language films